Nelson José Carrero Hera  (born 8 February 1953) is a former Venezuelan football player and current manager of UA Maracaibo. He played as an attacker.

Club career
Carrero played for Deportivo Galicia, ULA, Deportivo Italia, C.S. Marítimo de Venezuela and Caracas F.C.

International career
Carrero made 21 appearances for the senior Venezuela national football team from 1981 to 1985, including participation in the 1983 Copa América and 1987 Copa América.

He also competed for Venezuela at the 1980 Summer Olympics in Moscow, Soviet Union, where the team was eliminated after the preliminary round.

References

1958 births
Living people
Venezuelan footballers
Venezuela international footballers
Footballers at the 1980 Summer Olympics
Olympic footballers of Venezuela
1983 Copa América players
1987 Copa América players
Caracas FC players
Venezuelan football managers
Deportivo Italia players
C.S. Marítimo de Venezuela players
Association football forwards
Zamora F.C. managers